Əlicanlı, Zardab or Alidzhanly, Zardab or Alydzhanly may refer to:
Birinci Əlicanlı, Azerbaijan
İkinci Əlicanlı, Azerbaijan